The second USS Savannah was a frigate in the United States Navy. She was named after the city of Savannah, Georgia.

Savannah was begun in 1820 at the New York Navy Yard, but she remained on the stocks until 5 May 1842, when she was launched. She was one of nine frigates to be built from a prototype design by naval architect William Doughty.

Savannah, with Captain Andrew Fitzhugh in command, joined the Pacific Squadron as flagship in 1844. As the prospect of war with Mexico became imminent, the Squadron moved into position off the California coast. On 7 July 1846, the Squadron captured Monterey without firing a shot. On 8 September 1847, Savannah returned to New York for repairs.

She served as flagship for the Pacific Squadron again from 1849–52. Repairs at Norfolk, Virginia took her into 1853, and on 9 August of that year, she sailed for a three-year cruise on the Brazil Station. In November 1856 she was inactivated, and in 1857, razeed, or reduced to a 24 gun sloop of war.  She then served as flagship for the Home Squadron on the east coast of Mexico during 1859 and 1860.

USS Savannah,  and two charted steamers fought the small Battle of Anton Lizardo in 1860. Two armed Mexican vessels were captured by the Americans after they were deemed pirates by the Mexican government.

With the outbreak of the American Civil War in 1861, Savannah was deployed off the coast of Georgia, where she shared in the capture of two Confederate prizes, the schooner, E. J. Waterman, and the ship, Cheshire. On 11 February 1862, Savannah was taken out of active service and placed in use as an instruction and practice ship at the United States Naval Academy.

While in service as a practice ship, one of Savannah's commanding officers, Captain Edward Gabriel André Barrett, wrote and published two texts, still available at present, known for rapid education of voluntary officers: "NAVAL HOWITZER" and "GUNNERY INSTRUCTIONS" 

In 1870, after conducting her last training cruise to England and France, she was laid up at the Norfolk Navy Yard. She remained there until sold to E. Stannard and Company of Westbrook, Connecticut, in 1883.

See also

List of sailing frigates of the United States Navy
Sailing ship tactics
Union blockade
Union Navy

References

External links
Log Book of the U.S.S. Savannah, 1865, MS 138 and Log Book of the U.S.S. Savannah, 1868, MS 139 held by Special Collections & Archives, Nimitz Library at the United States Naval Academy

Sailing frigates of the United States Navy
Mexican–American War ships of the United States
Ships of the Union Navy
Ships built in Brooklyn
American Civil War patrol vessels of the United States
United States Naval Academy
Training ships of the United States Navy
1842 ships